Bradley Alan Moore (born June 21, 1964) is a former pitcher in Major League Baseball who played for the Philadelphia Phillies in parts of two seasons spanning 1988–1990.

Career
He was not drafted or offered any scholarships out of high school. After working as a landscaper and playing amateur baseball for a year after high school, he joined the college baseball team at Garden City Community College in Garden City, Kansas. Moore then received a scholarship to play baseball at Grand Canyon University. He led the team in pitching appearances in 1986 en route to a victory in the NAIA World Series. He was described in The Oklahoman during that season as the team's "bullpen ace."

Moore was undrafted out of Grand Canyon and joined the Philadelphia Phillies organization after attending an open tryout at Cherry Creek High School in Colorado. He was assigned to the Bend Phillies of the Northwest League to begin his professional career in 1986. In June 1988, he was promoted directly from Double-A to the National League. He made his Major League debut on June 14, 1988, against the Montreal Expos at Veterans Stadium. He pitched 2.2 scoreless innings in relief of Bruce Ruffin. All three innings were ended by double plays started by Phillies second baseman Juan Samuel. Moore would pitch four more games with the Phillies that season without surrendering a run. Moore would spend the entire 1989 season in the minors before returning to the majors with the Phillies in 1990. He pitched in three games in relief, all in April. It would be his final action at the Major League level. He was demoted to Triple-A on May 1.

Prior to the 1991 season, Moore signed with the New York Mets. In 1992, the Mets invited him to participate in spring training but reassigned him to the minor leagues in late March.

Moore spent the 1993 and 1994 seasons in the farm systems of the Cincinnati Reds and Pittsburgh Pirates respectively. His final stop as a professional player came with the Wei Chuan Dragons of the Chinese Professional Baseball League in 1994.

Moore began serving as the pitching coach at Mountain View High School in Loveland, Colorado in 2006. , he was still in that position.

Personal life
Moore was one of multiple sons born to Barbara and Lew Moore.

Moore met his wife, Lisa, in 1987 at a parade in Clearwater, Florida while she was a waitress and he was playing for the Clearwater Phillies. Their son, Logan, was born in Scranton, Pennsylvania in August 1990 while Moore was playing with the Scranton/Wilkes-Barre Red Barons.

Logan Moore was selected by the Phillies in the ninth round of the 2011 Major League Baseball draft.

References

External links

Brad Moore at Pura Pelota (Venezuelan Professional Baseball League)

1964 births
Living people
Alacranes de Campeche players
American expatriate baseball players in Mexico
American expatriate baseball players in Taiwan
Baseball players from Colorado
Bend Phillies players
Buffalo Bisons (minor league) players
Clearwater Phillies players
Garden City Broncbusters baseball players
Grand Canyon Antelopes baseball players
Indianapolis Indians players
Major League Baseball pitchers
Navegantes del Magallanes players
American expatriate baseball players in Venezuela
People from Loveland, Colorado
Philadelphia Phillies players
Reading Phillies players
Scranton/Wilkes-Barre Red Barons players
Tidewater Tides players
Wei Chuan Dragons players
Anchorage Bucs players